Petrucciani is a surname. Notable people with the surname include:

 Michel Petrucciani (1962–1999), French jazz pianist
 Oliver Petrucciani (born 1969), Swiss motorcycle racer
 Ricky Petrucciani (born 2000), Swiss athlete

Surnames of Italian origin